Carl Hall may refer to:

 Carl Hall (singer) (1934-1999), African-American singer, actor, and musical arranger
 Carl Hall (mountaineer) (1848–1908), Danish mountaineering pioneer
 Carl "Nickie" Hall (born 1959), American football player
 Carl Christian Hall (1812–1888), Danish statesman
 Carl Austin Hall, murderer of Bobby Greenlease
 Carl Hall (rugby), New Zealand rugby league, and rugby union footballer of the 1980s, 1990s and 2000s